James Frederick Mosolf (August 21, 1905 – December 28, 1979) was an outfielder in Major League Baseball. He played for the Pittsburgh Pirates and Chicago Cubs.

In 118 games over four seasons, Mosolf posted a .295 batting average (56-for-190) with 39 runs, 2 home runs and 28 RBI.

References

External links

1905 births
1979 deaths
Major League Baseball outfielders
Pittsburgh Pirates players
Chicago Cubs players
Baseball players from Washington (state)
People from Dallas, Oregon
Sportspeople from Puyallup, Washington
Washington Huskies baseball players